Stavros Toutziarakis (born November 5, 1987) is a Greek professional basketball player for Eleftheroupoli Kavalas OF THE Greek 2nd Division. He is 2.10 m (6'10 ") tall, and he plays at the center position.

Professional career
Toutziarakis started his amateur level career with Aristotelis Florinas, where he stayed from 1999 to 2002. He then played with Mantoulidis until 2006, when he signed his first pro level contract with Makedonikos. In 2007, he signed with the EuroCup side Maroussi, where he stayed for two seasons.

In 2009, Totziarakis moved to AEK Athens where he played for one season, being a choice of AEK's head coach at the time, Kostas Flevarakis. In the following two seasons, Toutziarakis played with Ikaros Kallitheas-Esperos and OFI Crete. After that, joined the Solna Vikings in 2012.

In 2014, he signed with MAFC of the Hungarian League. On May 30, 2015, he returned to Greece, and joined Kymi of the Greek 2nd Division. He was voted the Greek 2nd Division's MVP in 2016. In his comeback to the Greek Basket League with Kymis, Toutziarakis had a good season, and in 24 games played, he averaged 10.7 points, 6.2 rebounds, and 1 assist per game.

After two years with Kymi, in April 2017, he moved to Al Sadd Doha of the Qatari Basketball League, until the end of the season, being coached there by Manos Manouselis. On June 21, 2017, Toutziarakis joined Promitheas Patras of the Greek Basket League. With Promitheas, he finished in the 3rd place in the regular season of the Greek Basket League.

After one year with Promitheas, Toutziarakis returned to Kymi on June 19, 2018. With Kymi, he eventually became the team captain. On August 15, 2019, Toutziarakis signed with Kolossos Rodou. On October 25, 2020, Toutziarakis signed with Ionikos Nikaias.

National team career
Toutziarakis was a member of the junior national teams of Greece. With Greece's junior national teams, he played at the following tournaments: the 2003 FIBA Europe Under-16 Championship, the 2004 FIBA Europe Under-18 Championship, the 2005 FIBA Europe Under-18 Championship, the 2006 FIBA Europe Under-20 Championship, and the 2007 FIBA Europe Under-20 Championship. With Greece's under-26 national team, he won the silver medal at the 2009 Mediterranean Games.

References

External links
Stavros Toutziarakis at aek.com
Stavros Toutziarakis at archive.fiba.com 
Stavros Toutziarakis at basket.gr 
Stavros Toutziarakis at draftexpress.com
Stavros Toutziarakis at eurobasket.com
Stavros Toutziarakis at eurocupbasketball.com
Stavros Toutziarakis at fibaeurope.com

1987 births
Living people
AEK B.C. players
Al Sadd Doha basketball players
Centers (basketball)
Competitors at the 2009 Mediterranean Games
Greek men's basketball players
Greek Basket League players
Ikaros B.C. players
Kolossos Rodou B.C. players
Kymis B.C. players
MAFC basketball players
Makedonikos B.C. players
Maroussi B.C. players
Mediterranean Games medalists in basketball
Mediterranean Games silver medalists for Greece
OFI Crete B.C. players
Promitheas Patras B.C. players
Solna Vikings players
Sportspeople from Florina